Zdravko Čolić (born 30 May 1951) is a Bosnian-Serbian pop singer and is widely considered one of the greatest vocalists and cultural icons of the former Yugoslavia. Dubbed the 'Tom Jones' of the Balkans He has garnered fame in Southeastern Europe for his emotionally expressive tenor voice, fluent stage presence and numerous critically and commercially acclaimed albums and singles.

Among his songs, "Ti si mi u krvi" (from same-named album) is widely considered one of the most popular ballads of ex-Yugoslav music.

Early life
Born in Sarajevo, PR Bosnia and Herzegovina, FPR Yugoslavia to Bosnian Serb parents, police administrator Vladimir Čolić from the Vlahovići village near Ljubinje (Herzegovina) and homemaker Stana Čolić from Trebinje (East Herzegovina), Čolić grew up with a younger brother Dragan. Showing an early interest in sports, the youngster was active as a football goalkeeper in FK Željezničar's youth system, before switching to track and field where he also excelled in the 100 metres and long jump. At one point he ran a 100-meter dash in 11.3 seconds, and continually placed high at various events he entered (finishing just behind future star Nenad Stekić at one of them). Čolić eventually gave up on a career in sports, feeling he lacked the discipline required to compete on a regular basis.

Growing up in Sarajevo, Čolić attended the Vladimir Perić Valter elementary school in the Skenderija neighbourhood near the adjacent neighbourhood of Grbavica where he lived. He also attended music school, studying guitar playing. As a hobby, he took part in various school recitals, and also acted in a couple of plays at the Pionirsko pozorište (youth theatre).

Early career

Early years
Since the youngest age Čolić showed an interest in music. With friend Braco Isović, he played guitar at informal and impromptu park gatherings around their neighbourhood through which they became known locally as 'Čola i Isa sa Grbavice'. At the time, Čolić was trying to emulate pop schlager music that dominated Yugoslav and Italian festivals. His first love was Milena Mijatović from Belgrade.

His first significant public singing experience occurred in 1967 while at the Montenegrin coast for the Yugoslav Republic Day celebrations. Staying in the wooden prefab vacation home his family owned in the coastal community of Baošići, seventeen-year-old Čolić was persuaded by a friend, Nedim Idrizović, to enter an amateur signing competition in nearby Bijela. The teenager won second prize singing "Lady Madonna" by The Beatles.

Encouraged by the unexpected success, soon after returning to Sarajevo, Čolić entered his first band—a group called 'Mladi i lijepi'. This participation lasted until he graduated high school in 1969 when he decided to move on to the more established Ambasadori, a band whose two incarnations Čolić would end up staying with for the next two and a half years.

Ambasadori

When Čolić joined them, Ambasadori employed an unusual setup: being essentially a military cover band as all the musicians, except for bandleader Slobodan Vujović, were Yugoslav People's Army (JNA) ranked officers. Their repertoire centred around 1960s rhythm & blues (Chicago, Otis Redding, Wilson Pickett, etc.) along with obligatory Yugoslav hits of the day and years past, and finally even a few original numbers written by the bandmembers thrown into the mix. Over time, the group started getting more gig offers, which presented a problem since its army part was not available for many of them and those offers had to be declined.

Seeing their opportunities limited by the strange situation, Vujović and Čolić decided to step out and form Novi ambasadori in 1970, bringing in drummer Perica Stojanović, organist Vlado Pravdić, saxophonist Lale Stefanović, and bassist Zlatko Hold. With the almost all new lineup, the band also expanded its repertoire so that in addition to R&B they now also played covers of Led Zeppelin, Blood, Sweat & Tears, Creedence Clearwater Revival, etc. In the summer of 1970, Novi ambasadori scored a month-long gig with  Indexi in Dubrovnik, which was their first tour-like experience.

Next step was competing at the 1971  annual festival in Sarajevo where they finished in 7th place with a song "Plačem za tvojim usnama" that songwriter Zdenko Runjić claimed to have composed and officially signed his name under, despite the fact that it was a blatant rip-off of The Tremeloes' "Suddenly You Love Me" (which actually is a cover of Riccardo Del Turco's "Uno tranquillo" ). No one from the festival noticed this plagiarism and the band avoided the controversy. The song was even released on a 7-inch single "Plačem za tvojim usnama" / "Zapjevaj" by Beograd Disk and sold surprisingly well. The performance at Vaš šlager sezone was also significant since it marked the band's first television appearance, exposing them to a much larger audience. One of the people in that TV audience was Kornelije Kovač, an already influential and established figure in Yugoslav music circles, who immediately was intrigued by Čolić's "clean tenor and good stage presence".

Čolić was soon offered a "bench role" with Indexi, to fill in for their singer Davorin Popović, and even performed with them a couple of times.

Korni grupa

In the meantime, during summer of 1971, Čolić finally met face to face with Kornelije Kovač who came to see Čolić play in Mostar and invited him to join his Korni grupa as replacement to their departed singer Dado Topić. Unlike Amabasadori, Korni grupa performed their own material and generally had a much more studious and serious approach to music, so Čolić immediately jumped at the opportunity.

On 10 September 1971, twenty-year-old Čolić left his hometown and moved to the capital Belgrade in order to join his new band. However, his stint with Korni grupa ultimately proved to be very short and largely unsuccessful as he never meshed well enough with the rest of the group musically, finding it hard to fit into their progressive rock style. He recorded three tracks with them, "Kukavica, "Gospa Mica gazdarica", and "Pogledaj u nebo", all of which were released on the 7-inch single by PGP RTB. Track "Gospa Mica gazdarica" managed to create minor controversy due to the slightly risque lyrics written from the perspective of a young man imploring his older female landlord to allow him into her bed—a nod to Čolić's life at the time since he was living away from home in sublet apartments. Due to numerous complaints, the song was taken off radio playlists.

Soon, however, Čolić and Kovač agreed that it would be better for Čolić to go solo. Only six months upon his arrival to Belgrade, he returned to Sarajevo determined to give solo career a try.

Solo career

Early activity: Schlager festivals
On 15 April 1972 Čolić's first solo move was taking part in the  competitive festival in Sarajevo. He won the third audience prize as well as the interpretation award with Kemal Monteno written song "Sinoć nisi bila tu" that was originally meant to be sung by Josipa Lisac who opted out at the last moment.

Right away, under Kovač's guidance Čolić managed to establish a fair amount of prominence as a solo act—and on 20 May 1972 the two appeared as guests on the very popular TV Belgrade variety show  hosted by Milena Dravić and Dragan Nikolić. The same year, Čolić made further appearances at the Split festival (with song "Stara pjesma"), Priština festival, and Skopje Festival (with song "Moj bol"), before embarking on a tour of Soviet Union together with Indexi, Bisera Veletanlić, Sabahudin Kurt, and Sabina Varešanović.

Eurovision and more festivals

Then came the first big break that launched him on the road to stardom. By winning at the Opatija festival with song "Gori vatra" written by Kemal Monteno, Čolić got to represent SFR Yugoslavia at the 1973 Eurovision Song Contest on 7 April 1973 in Luxembourg. The song placed poorly, but became a well-respected hit at home.

Riding the wave of exposure the Eurovision appearance afforded him, Čolić continued entering competitive festivals throughout SFR Yugoslavia over the next two years with plenty of success. At Hit parada festival in Belgrade on 23 November 1974, he won with the song "Ona spava", composed and written by Kornelije Kovač. Next year, 1975, Čolić bagged a few more festival wins with Kovač's songs—Beogradsko proleće with "April u Beogradu", and Vaš šlager sezone with "Zvao sam je Emili". Other songs he performed at various festivals in those years were "Bling blinge blinge bling" (1973 Vaš šlager sezone, composed by Zdenko Runjić), "Ljubav je samo riječ" (1974 Beogradsko proleće, composed by Vojkan Borisavljević), and "Zelena si rijeka bila" (1974 Vaš šlager sezone, composed by Kemal Monteno).

Around the same time he also signed a deal with the German arm of WEA record label and did two singles for that market. German producers were of the opinion that his name was too difficult to pronounce for their consumers so they marketed him as Dravco. Soon, however, Čolić decided not to pursue his options in that country further mostly because he was unwilling to move to Germany.

Debut album
His first solo album was Ti i ja (You and I), released in 1975 by Jugoton. Closely overseen by Kornelije Kovač, the album brought Čolić more hits like "Vagabund", "Igraš se vatrom", and "Loše vino" (written by Arsen Dedić and Goran Bregović). Cover sleeve was done by Dragan S. Stefanović, another collaborator who would remain with Čolić for years to come. Čolić's image especially appealed to girls and women, something that would remain a staple of his entire career. The same year, cashing in on his sudden popularity upswing, PGP RTB released a compilation of his festival singles under the name Zdravko Čolić.

Despite, achieving great prominence already, Čolić continued appearing at the occasional festival such as the Zagreb one in 1976 where he surprisingly finished in fourth place singing "Ti si bila, uvijek bila". At the end of that year he went on a Yugoslavia-wide tour with Indexi. After the Belgrade concert, the measure of his sudden fame was on public display during autograph-signing at the Jugoton store as the cordon of girls rushed the store, breaking a window glass in attempt to get closer to him.

The next year, 1977, he did the festival circuit for the last time, first in Zagreb with "Živiš u oblacima", followed by an appearance at the Festival of Patriotic Songs also in Zagreb, where he performed . That song was soon released on a 7-inch  and sold 300,000 copies.

Mass popularity
His second album, Ako priđeš bliže (If You Come Closer), released later that year, was even more successful, creating mass hysteria among girls for his music. The copies were extremely sought-after, as 50,000 sold in the first two weeks alone. The album contained some of his best known and liked songs such as "Glavo luda", "Zagrli me", "Juče još", "Pjevam danju, pjevam noću", "Jedna zima sa Kristinom", and "Produži dalje".

On 1 April 1978, he started an ambitious tour of SFR Yugoslavia with Lokice dance group in support of the album that had already sold 150,000 copies. Čolić also started to play the guitar occasionally on stage. Putujući zemljotres (Traveling Earthquake Tour) produced and organized by Maksa Ćatović moved all over the country, soon becoming a phenomenon the likes of which the country had not seen before. The scenes of screaming girls rushing the stage were repeated in a city after a city. The tour's climax took place in Belgrade at Red Star FC stadium on 5 September 1978 with 70,000 people in attendance despite the fact that Čolić already played two sold-out shows in Belgrade a few months earlier on 4 and 8 April at Hala Pionir. Supporting Čolić on stage that night were Chris Nicholls on keyboards and Dado Topić on bass guitar, with old favourites Kornelije Kovač, Arsen Dedić, Kemal Monteno, Josip Boček, Trio Strune, and RTV Belgrade singing quintet appearing as guests. Čolić and the great tour essentially became a cultural phenomenon transcending musical boundaries such that in the lead-up to the big Belgrade concert journalist Dušan Savković and film director Jovan Ristić decided to make a movie about Čolić. Savković wrote a rudimentary screenplay, but the movie ended up being a 90-minute feature documentary titled Pjevam danju, pjevam noću that follows Čolić from Belgrade concert onwards and looks back on his career up to that point. Two days after the Belgrade concert, Čolić was in his hometown Sarajevo at Koševo Stadium for the tour's grand finale; however, the rain interrupted much of the concert. By the end of its promotion cycle, the album sold more than 700,000 copies and with later re-releases during the 1990s went over the million mark.

Čolić also got the attention of Ziggy Loch, director of German WEA, who immediately after watching the Belgrade concert wanted to renew his contract. Singles with songs "Jedina" and "Zagrli me" were released for the German market as well as the disco single "I'm Not a Robot Man" / "Light Me". However, Čolić refused to move to Germany for the second time, and instead on 14 November 1978 went to serve his mandatory Yugoslav Army stint. Twenty seven years of age at the time, Čolić was assigned to a unit in Valjevo, before getting transferred to Belgrade, and finally Požarevac. After serving 10 months, he got out of the military service on 14 September 1979.

1980s
Upon his return from the army, Čolić started work on his third album—that came out in the spring of 1980, entitled Zbog tebe; it brought more hits as Čola further secured his position of the most popular pop performer in Yugoslavia.

In 1984, Čolić moved from his hometown Sarajevo to Ljubljana where he started a private business with Goran Bregović through their Kamarad label. He then lived in Zagreb for five years. 1988 saw his hit "Jastreb". In 1989, he moved back to Belgrade.

Comeback
After his 1990 album "Da ti kažem šta mi je", Čolić didn't make another album until late 1997, when he embarked on a comeback with Komuna label album Kad bi moja bila, and regained much of his popularity. The following year, he had nine sold-out concerts at Sava Centar.

In October 2005, Čolić performed two concerts at the Belgrade Arena.

Čolić voiced Shelby Forthright (originally played by Fred Willard) in the Bosnian dub of the acclaimed 2008 Pixar release WALL-E.

In 2010, he had a big concert on the Asim Ferhatović Hase Stadium in Sarajevo, within his Kad pogledaš me preko ramena tour, in front of over 60,000 people. On 25 June 2011, he had the biggest concert of his career: on Ušće, in Belgrade, with over 100,000 visitors. His biggest concert to date, it celebrated his 40-year career milestone.

Personal life
At the outbreak of the Bosnian War, Čolić moved to Belgrade, and has lived there ever since. He holds a degree in economics from the University of Sarajevo. Čolić is married to wife Aleksandra Aleksić, and has two daughters.

Discography

Studio albums
Ti i ja (You And Me) (1975)
Ako priđeš bliže (If You Come Closer) (1977)
Zbog tebe (Because Of You) (1980)
Malo pojačaj radio (Turn Up The Radio A Bit) (1981)
Šta mi radiš (What Are You Doing To Me?) (1983)
Ti si mi u krvi (You Are In My Blood) (1984)
Rodi me, majko, sretnog (Give A Birth To Me, [My] Mother, As A Happy Guy) (1988)
Da ti kažem šta mi je (To Tell You What's Up With Me) (1990)
Kad bi moja bila (If You Were Mine) (1997)
Okano (My Eyelish) (2000)
Čarolija (Enchantment) (2003)
Zavičaj (Homeland) (2006)
Kad pogledaš me preko ramena (When You Look At Me Over the Shoulder) (2010)
Vatra i barut (Fire And Gunpowder) (2013)
Ono malo sreće (That Bit Of Luck) (2017)

Singles
"Sinoć nisi bila tu" / "Tako tiho" (1972)
"Stara pisma" / "Pod lumbrelom" (1972)
"Gori vatra" / "Isti put" (1973)
"Blinge blinge blinge bling" / "Julija" (1973)
"Zelena si rijeka bila" / "Ne dam ti svoju ljubav" (1973)
"Dome moj" / "Ljubav je samo riječ" (1974)
"Madre Mia" / "Rock n roll himmel" (released in Germany) (1974)
"Alles was ich hab" / "Lampenfieber" (released in Germany) (1974)
"Ona spava" / "Zaboravi sva proljeća" (1975)
"April u Beogradu" / "Svitanje" (1975)
"Zvao sam je Emili" / "Sonata" (1975)
"Ti si bila, uvijek bila" / "A sad sam ja na redu" (1976)
"Ljubav ima lažni sjaj" / "Balerina" (1977)
"Živiš u oblacima" / "Zašto spavaš" (1977)
"Loš glas" / "Ne mogu biti tvoj" (1978)
"Light me" / "I'm not a robot man" (released in Germany) (1978)
"Druže Tito, mi ti se kunemo" / "Titovim putem" (1980)
"Sto dukata" (2022)

Live albums
Stadium Marakana (2001) /Live, 2xDVD/
Belgrade Arena (2005) /Live, 2xDVD/
Stadium Marakana (2007) /Live, 2xDVD/
Stadium Koševo (2010) /Live, 2xDVD/
Belgrade Ušće  (2011) /Live, 2xDVD/

Compilations
Pjesme koje volimo (The Songs We Like) (1984)
Poslednji i prvi (The First And the Last) (1994)
Zauvek (Forever) (1998)
Zauvek 2 (Forever 2) (1999)
7X Čola Box Set (2000)
Balade (The Ballads) (2002)
The Best of Zdravko Čolić (double-CD set) (2004)
The Best of Zdravko Čolić (2008)

Tours
Vatra i barut Tour (2014–15)
Ono malo sreće Tour (2018–19)

Note

References

Sources

External links

1951 births
20th-century Bosnia and Herzegovina male singers
21st-century Bosnia and Herzegovina male singers
Ballad musicians
Bosnia and Herzegovina emigrants to Serbia
Bosnia and Herzegovina male singers
Bosnia and Herzegovina pop singers
Bosnia and Herzegovina rock singers
Bosnia and Herzegovina singer-songwriters
Eurovision Song Contest entrants for Yugoslavia
Eurovision Song Contest entrants of 1973
Indexi Award winners
Living people
Musicians from Sarajevo
Serbian male singers
Serbian pop singers
Serbian singer-songwriters
Serbs of Bosnia and Herzegovina
University of Sarajevo alumni
Yugoslav male singers
Yugoslav musicians